Stadionul Municipal is a multi-use stadium in Odorheiu Secuiesc, Romania. It is used mostly for football matches and is the home ground of AFC Odorheiu Secuiesc and Vasas Femina FC. The stadium holds 5,000 people and the sports complex also benefits of a second ground with a pitch of normal dimensions, covered by artificial turf.

References

Football venues in Romania
Buildings and structures in Harghita County
Odorheiu Secuiesc